Juan López de Zárate (June 24, 1490 – September 10, 1555) was a Roman Catholic prelate who served as the first Bishop of Antequera, Oaxaca (1535–1555).

Biography
Juan López de Zárate was born in Oviedo, Spain. On June 21, 1535, he was appointed by Pope Paul III as Bishop of Antequera, Oaxaca.
On April 8, 1537, he was consecrated bishop by Don Juan de Zumárraga, Archbishop of Mexico. 
He served as Bishop of Antequera, Oaxaca until his death on September 10, 1555.

While bishop, he was the principal consecrator of Martín Sarmiento de Osacastro, Bishop of Tlaxcala (1549) and the principal co-consecrator of Francisco Marroquín Hurtado, Bishop of Santiago de Guatemala (1537)

References

External links and additional sources
 (for Chronology of Bishops) 
 (for Chronology of Bishops) 

1490 deaths
1555 deaths
Bishops appointed by Pope Paul III
People from Oviedo
16th-century Roman Catholic bishops in Mexico